The 2018 Windsor municipal election occurred on October 22, 2018 to elect the Mayor of Windsor, Windsor City Council and the Greater Essex County District School Board, Windsor Essex Catholic District School Board, Conseil scolaire catholique Providence and Conseil scolaire Viamonde. The election was held on the same day as elections in every other municipality in Ontario.

As per the Ontario Municipal Elections Act, 1996, nomination papers for candidates for municipal and school board elections would be filed from May 1, 2018, at which time the campaign period began.

Mayor

City Council

Ward 1

Ward 2

Ward 3

Ward 4

Ward 5

*Withdrawn but still on ballot

Ward 6

Ward 7

Ward 8

Ward 9

Ward 10

Greater Essex County District School Board

Wards 1, 2, 9

Wards 3, 4, 10

Wards 5, 6, 7, 8

Windsor Essex Catholic District School Board

Wards 1, 10

Wards 2, 9

Wards 3, 4

Wards 5, 8

Wards 6, 7

Conseil Scolaire Viamonde

Wards 1-10 (Windsor only)

Conseil Scolaire Catholique Providence

Wards 6, 7 (Windsor only)

References

Windsor
Municipal elections in Windsor, Ontario